Marco Fuser (born 9 March 1991) is an Italian professional rugby union player who primarily plays lock for Massy of the Pro D2. He has also represented Italy at international level, having made his test debut against Canada during the 2012 Summer Internationals. Fuser has previously played for clubs such as Mogliano, Benetton, and Newcastle Falcons in the past.

Professional career 
From 2012 to 2020, he played for Benetton Treviso.  From 2020 to 2022 He played for Newcastle Falcons in the Premiership Rugby.

In May 2012, Fuser was called up by the Italian national rugby union team against Canada. On 14 June, he made his international debut for Italy against Canada.
On 24 August 2015, he was named in the final 31-man squad for the 2015 Rugby World Cup.

References

External links 

1991 births
Living people
Italian rugby union players
Italy international rugby union players
Benetton Rugby players
Rugby union locks